Beard Miller Company LLP (bmc), a legacy firm of ParenteBeard LLC, was an accounting and auditing firm serving clients mainly in the mid-Atlantic region of the United States.  The firm was created through a series of mergers, the largest occurring in January 2001 between Beard & Company and Miller & Company. Prior to merging with Parente Randolph in October 2009, bmc had 16 offices located in Pennsylvania, Maryland, New Jersey and New York, and more than 600 employees. bmc was a member of the larger BDO Seidman Alliance, which enables Accounting and Consulting organizations other than the "Big 4 auditors" to share resources which may be otherwise unattainable.  The CEO of bmc was Lamar Stoltzfus, who is now chairman of ParenteBeard.

Branding

Though the firm’s legal name was Beard Miller Company, the firm elected to use its initials in lower case (bmc) in day-to-day operations.  The firm also used numbers in the place of letters when advertising the brand’s image, a form of "rebus".  For instance, the word “vision”, which appeared prominently in the company’s literature, is spelled out V1510N.

Services

bmc provided the following services: Audit (including IT Audit and Employee Benefits), Tax Consulting and Form Preparation, and Business Consulting.  The firm also had a sister organization, bmc Financial Advisors, which, while technically a separate entity, worked closely with the larger accounting organization.

National Rankings
 9th in SEC clients serviced in 2008
 39th in Net Revenue in 2008
 14th in growth between 2007 and 2008

Locations

Beard Miller Company has 16 American offices in Pennsylvania, Maryland, New York and New Jersey.

Merger

In August 2009, the firm announced that it would merge with Parente Randolph, another Mid-Atlantic public accounting firm, effective October 1, 2009.  The new firm is headquartered in Philadelphia, PA and is named ParenteBeard LLC.

References

External links 
bmc website
BDO Seidman Alliance homepage

Companies based in Reading, Pennsylvania
Defunct accounting firms of the United States
Companies with year of establishment missing
Companies disestablished in 2009